East 116th–St. Luke's is a station on the RTA Blue and Green Lines in Cleveland, Ohio. It is located at the intersection of East 116th Street and Shaker Boulevard.

The station comprises side platforms below grade in the median of Shaker Boulevard west of East 116th Street. The station can be accessed from street level via either a set of stairs or a ramp to each platform.

History
The station opened on April 11, 1920 when service commenced on the line west of Shaker Square to East 34th Street and via surface streets to downtown.

In 1980 and 1981, the trunk line of the Green and Blue Lines from East 55th Street to Shaker Square was completely renovated with new track, ballast, poles and wiring, and new stations were built along the line. At East 116th station, new platforms and retaining walls were installed, and the wooden stairways were replaced by the present covered concrete stairways. The renovated line opened on October 30, 1981.

The East 116th station originally served St. Luke's Hospital which opened in 1927 on Shaker Boulevard just west of East 116th Street. The Hospital closed in April 1999. A gradual name change was enacted in RTA timetables to coincide with the opening of the new station.

This station was originally planned to be rebuilt with upgraded amenities from January 2016 to September 2017. Those dates were retracted by late 2015. The groundbreaking for construction came on May 30, 2018, with a proposed completion date set for May 2019. The name East 116th–St. Luke's appeared on timetables as early as April 10, 2016. The station was opened ahead of schedule on March 8, 2019.

Station layout

Notable places nearby
 Weizer Building (11801 Buckeye Road, Cleveland, Ohio)
 St. Andrew Svorad Abbey
 Benedictine High School
 St. Luke's Hospital

References

External links

Blue Line (RTA Rapid Transit)
Green Line (RTA Rapid Transit)
Railway stations in the United States opened in 1920
1920 establishments in Ohio